The 2019 Phillips 66 National Swimming Championships were held from July 31 to August 4, 2019, at the Avery Aquatic Center in Stanford, California.

Men's events

Women's events

References

External links
 
 

United States Swimming National Championships
USA Swimming Championships
USA Swimming Championships
USA Swimming Championships
USA Swimming Championships
USA Swimming Championships